Arima is a genus of leaf beetles (Chrysomelidae) belonging to the subfamily Galerucinae. Species of this genus are found in France, on the Italian mainland, and in Sicily. They present clear sexual dimorphism, as females are generally much larger than males.

Species
 Arima brachyptera (Küster, 1844)
 Arima buai Havelka, 1959
 Arima marginata (Fabricius, 1781)
 Arima maritima Bua, 1953

External links
 BioLib
 Fauna Europaea

Galerucinae
Chrysomelidae genera
Taxa named by Félicien Chapuis
Beetles of Europe